Shatter cones are rare geological features that are only known to form in the bedrock beneath meteorite impact craters or underground nuclear explosions.

Morphology
Shatter cones have a distinctively conical shape that radiates from the top (apex) of the cones repeating cone-on-cone in large and small scales in the same sample. Sometimes they have more of a spoon shape on the side of a larger cone.  In finer-grained rocks such as limestone, they form an easily recognizable "horsetail" pattern with thin grooves (striae). However, the word "striae" should not be used to describe shatter cones, as that is considered misleading.

Coarser grained rocks tend to yield less well developed shatter cones, which may be difficult to distinguish from other geological formations such as slickensides.  Geologists have various theories of what causes shatter cones to form, including compression by the wave as it passes through the rock or tension as the rocks rebound after the pressure subsides.  The result is large and small branching fractures throughout the rocks.

Shatter cones can range in size from microscopic to several meters. The largest known shatter cone in the world (more than 10 metres in length) is located at the Slate Islands in Terrace Bay, Ontario, Canada. The azimuths of the cones' axes typically radiate outwards from the point of impact, with the cones pointing upwards and toward the center of the impact crater, although the orientations of some of the rocks have been changed by post-cratering geological processes at the site.

See also
 Breccia
 Coesite
 Lechatelierite
 Shocked quartz
 Stishovite

References

Further reading
 Johannes Baier (2018): Zur Entdeckung und Deutung der Strahlenkalke (Shatter-Cones) im Steinheimer Impaktkrater. In: Geohistorische Blätter, Vol. 29, S. 55–68.
 Johannes Baier (2018): Ein Beitrag zur Shatter-Cone-Bildung (Steinheimer Impaktkrater, Deutschland). In: Aufschluss, 69(6), S. 370–376.
 Johannes Baier & Volker J. Sach (2018): Shatter-Cones aus den Impaktkratern Nördlinger Ries und Steinheimer Becken. In: Fossilien, 35(2), S. 26–31.
 Volker J. Sach & Johannes Baier (2017): Neue Untersuchungen an Strahlenkalken und Shatter-Cones in Sediment- und Kristallingesteinen (Ries-Impakt und Steinheim-Impakt, Deutschland). Pfeil-Verlag, München. .

Impact craters
Impact geology
Petrology